Ranota Kathumar is a town and tehsil of Alwar district in the Indian state of Rajasthan.

Haneepur
Hanipur is a village in the tehsil KATHUMAR about 2.5 km away.

There are many villages in this sub-division, few of them are:

Kankroli
It has an ancient temple next to its secondary school. Bhavadas baba temple is also famous in the area. The village includes mostly Jat community, however it has Rajput, Brahmin, Banik, Meena, Khati, Lohar, Nai (Sain), Dhobi, Keer, Jatav and Harijan communities as well.

Nearest railway station is Kherli - 18 km (on Jaipur-Agra line) and Nagar - 15 km (on Alwar-Mathura line).

Village has its own bus stop (Kankroli bus stop), as it falls on Kathumar-Laxmangarh-Alwar road. It is 5 km from Kathumar. The bus stop is used by people from many villages such as Ishrota, Ishroti, Pahadi, and Indravali.

Nearest police station is Kathumar Police Thana (just 2 km). Police station is just at border of village itself.

Titpuri
It also has an Benami Shant Asharm behind the bus stand on road Salempur. Benami Shant Asharm is famous in the area.

Bhojpura
Bhojpura has a school that continues up to class VIII.

Tusari
Tusari also has a Govt school that runs up to class X. The village also has a girl's hostel and high school - Kasturba Gandhi Girls' hostel in the outskirts of the village.

Ishroti
Another village in the tehsil Kathumar is Ishroti, situated at Kathumar-Laxmangarh road.

Badka
There is another village Badka in the tehsil. In this village, 200 families reside.

Pitampura
There is another village named Pitampura situated west of Kherli Railway station. Economically most of the people here depend on daily petty works in Kherli.

Jarla
Jarla village is situated at Kathumar-Laxmangarh road, 15 km from Kathumar.

Baldeopura Gurjar 
Baldeopura village is situated between Badodakan and Tighariya. And direct route to Nagar.

Education

Shree Maa P.G. Mahavidyalaya is reputed college for higher education. It was founded in 2004.
There are many available schools, which are known for giving merit in the Board of Secondary Education Rajasthan like TPS and NMPS.

Economy

The main occupation of residents is farming. A Hindustan Petroleum gas agency has been started here, Desraj Gas Agency, situated on the Reta road in Kathumar.

Health
Gomati Devi Jan Seva Nidhi operates an eye clinic.

Transport 
Direct buses are available to Delhi, Jaipur, Bharatpur, Mathura, Agra and Alwar.

The nearest airport is in Jaipur.

One railway station is also present in the nearby town of Kherli. Kathumar's distance from Kherli Railway station is about 10 km. It is also connected to Brijnagar.

Tourism 
Famous temple of Dhaulagarh Devi is 3 km away from Noorpur village.

References

Cities and towns in Alwar district